Ji Wenlin (born July 1966) is a former Chinese politician. He was investigated by the Chinese Communist Party's anti-graft agency in February 2014. Previously he served as the Mayor of Haikou and the vice-Governor of Hainan.  He once worked as the secretary of Zhou Yongkang.

Biography
Ji was born in Liangcheng County, Inner Mongolia in July 1966. He graduated from China University of Geosciences, majoring in Geophysics.

He got involved in politics in July 1989 and joined the Chinese Communist Party in August 1994. In 1998 he joined the newly created Ministry of Land and Resources, working as the secretary of Minister Zhou Yongkang.

In 2008 he became a director of the Office Ministry of Land and Resources, a position he held until January 2009.

In February 2011, he was appointed the Mayor of Haikou, capital of Hainan province, then promoted to Vice-Governor of Hainan in January 2013.

On February 18, 2014, he was being investigated by the Central Commission for Discipline Inspection for "serious violations of laws and regulations". Ji was sentenced 12 years in prison for corruption on March 30, 2016.

References

1966 births
Chinese Communist Party politicians from Inner Mongolia
China University of Geosciences alumni
Living people
Political office-holders in Hainan
Expelled members of the Chinese Communist Party
People's Republic of China politicians from Inner Mongolia
People from Ulanqab
Chinese politicians convicted of corruption